Income in India discusses the financial state in India. With rising economic growth and prosperity, India’s income is also rising rapidly. As an overview, India's per capita net national income or NNI was around 1.97 lakh rupees in 2022. The per-capita income is a crude indicator of the prosperity of a country. In contrast, the gross national income at constant prices stood at over 128 trillion rupees. The same year, GNI growth rate at constant prices was around 6.6 percent. While GNI and NNI are both indicators for a country's economic performance and welfare, the GNI is related to the GDP or the Gross Domestic Product plus the net receipts from abroad, including wages and salaries, property income, net taxes and subsidies receivable from abroad. On the other hand, the NNI of a country is equal to its GNI net of depreciation.

Financial year data

India's nominal per capita income was US$1,670 per year in 2016, ranked 112th out of 164 countries by the World Bank, while its per capita income on purchasing power parity (PPP) basis was US$5,350, and ranked 106th. Other estimates for per capita gross national income and gross domestic product vary by source. For example, India's average GDP per capita on PPP basis in 2009, according to The Economist, was US$5,138, with significant variation among its states and union territories. Goa had the highest per capita PPP GDP at US$14,903, while Bihar the lowest with per capita PPP GDP of US$682 as of 2015 In rupee terms, India's per capita income grew by 10.4% to reach Rs.74,920 in 2013-14.

While India's per capita incomes were low, the average household size and consequent household incomes were higher. India had a total of 247 million households in 2011, with an average of about 4.9 people per household, according to Census of India.

Estimates for average household income and the size of India's middle income households vary by source. Using World Bank's definition of middle income families to be those with per capita income between $10 to $50 per day, the National Council of Applied Economic Research of India completed a survey and concluded there were 153 million people who belonged to middle income group in 2006. In contrast, Meyer and Birdsall and Tim Light used a different survey and estimated the number of Middle-Income population to be about 70 million in 2009-2010. These groups, as well as the World Bank, estimated in their 2011 reports that if India's economy continues to grow per projections, India's middle income group would double by 2015 over 2010 levels, and grow by an additional 500 million people by 2025. This would make it, with China, the world's largest middle income market.

Compared to other countries, income inequality in India is relatively small as measured by Gini coefficient. India had a Gini coefficient of 32.5 in the year 1999- 2000; India's nominal Gini index rose to 36.8 in 2005, while real Gini after tax remained nearly flat at 32.6.

The states of India have significant disparities in their average income. Bihar was by far the poorest in India, and per capita income was low in its neighbouring states, along with Uttar Pradesh, Jharkhand, Jammu & Kashmir, Assam, Manipur, and Nagaland. The higher income states include Goa, Delhi, Haryana, Sikkim, Telangana, Maharashtra, Tamil Nadu, Gujarat, Himachal Pradesh, Punjab, Uttarakhand, and Kerala.

Rural-urban gap

As in other countries, residents of Indian cities have a higher per capita income and standard of living than rural residents. Towns and cities make more than two-thirds of the Indian GDP, even though less than a third of the population live in them.

India has a high rate of migration from rural areas to urban areas. A major reason for migration to cities was the Partition of India. More than half of the refugees from Pakistan settled in urban areas such as Delhi. It is estimated that up to 590 million people, or 40% of the Indian population will be living in cities by 2030, much higher than the current 28%. It is also estimated that eight states, including West Bengal, Tamil Nadu, Gujarat, Maharashtra, Karnataka, Kerala, Telangana, and Punjab will have more than half of their total population living in Urban areas by 2030.

In India, urban areas have seen a much higher growth rate as compared to rural areas. Despite up to three-fourths of the population living in rural areas, rural areas contribute to only one-third of the national income. The main reason for rural India's poor performance in terms of income is the fact that rural India is mostly dependent on agriculture. The agriculture sector in India grew at a rate of only 1.6% in 2008-09, while the Indian Economy grew at a rate of 6.7%, despite the financial crisis of 2007–2008. An extremely slow rate of growth in the agriculture sector of the Indian economy has serious implications for the rural-urban divide, both in terms of income and GDP. Some estimates say that the average income of a person living in an urban area may be up to 4 times higher than that of a person living in a rural area. The rising levels of urbanisation in India is a major reason for the rising levels of income disparity in the country.

Bridging the Urban-Rural Gap

In India, the government has taken steps to bridge the urban-rural gap. This includes setting up the Council for Advancement of People's Action and Rural Technology (CAPART) by the Ministry of Rural Development. CAPART helps in providing assistance to various organisations which help in developmental activities. There is a constantly widening rift between rural and urban India, not only in terms of income but other social measures. There is an urgent need to strengthen the agriculture sector in India, bring about reforms in labour laws, and provide education.

The Economic Survey of India 2007 by OECD concluded that:

The analysis of this report suggests that the differences in economic performance across states are associated with the extent to which states have introduced market-oriented reforms. Thus, further reforms on these lines, complemented with measures to improve infrastructure, education and basic services, would increase the potential for growth outside of agriculture and thus boost better-paid employment, which is a key to sharing the fruits of growth and lowering poverty.

Statistics

See also
 List of Indian states and union territories by GDP per capita
 States of India by size of economy
 Poverty in India

References

External links
 Per Capita Net State Domestic Product – State-Wise (At Current Prices)
 National Income Of India